Gongnong may refer to these places in China:

Gongnong District, a district of Hegang, Heilongjiang
Gongnong, Guangyuan, a town in Guangyuan, Sichuan

Townships
Gongnong Township, Heilongjiang, in Tieli, Heilongjiang
Gongnong Township, Jilin, in Liaoyuan, Jilin

Subdistricts
Gongnong Subdistrict, Zhanjiang, in Xiashan District, Zhanjiang, Guangdong
Gongnong Subdistrict, Harbin, in Daoli District, Harbin, Heilongjiang
Gongnong Subdistrict, Luoyang, in Jianxi District, Luoyang, Henan
Gongnong Subdistrict, Songyuan, in Ningjiang District, Songyuan, Jilin
Gongnong Subdistrict, Fushun, in Wanghua District, Fushun, Liaoning
Gongnong Subdistrict, Liaoyang, in Hongwei District, Liaoyang, Liaoning
Gongnong Subdistrict, Deyang, in Jingyang District, Deyang, Sichuan